Amir Jamal Garrett (born May 3, 1992) is an American professional baseball pitcher for the Kansas City Royals of Major League Baseball (MLB). He previously played in MLB for the Cincinnati Reds. Garrett played college basketball for the St. John's Red Storm before pursuing a baseball career fully. He was drafted by the Reds in 2011 and made his MLB debut in 2017.

Early years
Garrett began his high school career at Sierra Vista High School in Spring Valley, Nevada, before he transferred to Leuzinger High School in Lawndale, California, for his junior year. He transferred again, to Findlay College Prep in Henderson, Nevada, for his senior year in 2010. Findlay does not have a baseball team. Eligible in the 2011 MLB draft, the Cincinnati Reds selected Garrett in the 22nd round. He signed with the Reds, receiving a $1 million signing bonus and permission to continue his basketball career. In the fall of 2011, Garrett enrolled at Bridgton Academy in Bridgton, Maine, where he played on the basketball team throughout the 2011–12 season, until enrolling at St. John's University.

College career

Heading into college, Garrett was a four-star basketball recruit, ranked 68th in the country, and the 21st best small forward. Garrett committed to attend St. John's University to play college basketball for the St. John's Red Storm men's basketball team.

Garrett was ruled ineligible to play for the college basketball team for the fall semester of his freshman year, in the 2011–12 season, due to academic reasons. He instead spent the fall semester at Bridgton Academy in Bridgton, Maine where he participated in the fall baseball program. He was declared eligible in December. As a freshman, Garrett played 26.9 minutes per game. After the basketball season, Garrett played baseball for the Arizona Reds of the Rookie-level Arizona League and the Billings Mustangs of the Rookie-level Pioneer League, pitching to a 4.05 earned run average (ERA) with 18 strikeouts and 13 walks in 20 innings pitched.

As a sophomore, Garrett started 11 games, averaging 5.4 points per game and 4.3 rebounds per game in 20.1 minutes per game. After the 2012–13 college basketball season, Garrett announced that he was leaving St. John's, with the intention of transferring to another college basketball team. He transferred to California State University, Northridge, and sat out the 2013–14 season due to NCAA transfer rules. After redshirting his first year, Garrett withdrew from the Matadors to pursue a pro baseball career.

Professional career

Cincinnati Reds
Garrett began the 2013 baseball season with Billings, but was promoted to the Dayton Dragons of the Class A Midwest League in July. He finished the season with a 5.15 ERA, 32 strikeouts, and 26 walks in  innings. He returned to Dayton for the start of the 2014 season. In August 2014, Garrett decided to quit basketball and withdraw from Cal-State Northridge in order to focus on baseball. He had a 7–8 record and a 3.65 ERA in 27 games started, and the Reds added him to their 40-man roster after the season. He began the 2015 season with the Daytona Tortugas of the Class A-Advanced Florida State League (FSL), and was chosen to represent the Reds at the 2015 All-Star Futures Game. Garrett finished the 2015 season with a 2.44 ERA and 133 strikeouts for Daytona, and with Jacob Faria, was named the Co-FSL Pitcher of the Year.

Garrett opened the 2016 season with the Pensacola Blue Wahoos of the Class AA Southern League. The Reds promoted him to the Louisville Bats of the Class AAA International League in June. He was named to appear in the 2016 All-Star Futures Game. He finished 2016 with a 7–8 record and a 2.55 ERA.

Garrett made the Reds' Opening Day roster in 2017. In his major league debut on April 7 against the St. Louis Cardinals, Garrett went six shutout innings, giving up just two hits and earning the win in the Reds 2–0 victory over the Cardinals.

On May 7, 2017, Garrett was optioned down to Reds AAA affiliate Louisville Bats, RHP Barrett Astin was recalled. On May 25, 2017, Garrett was placed on the 10-day disabled list due to right hip inflammation. Garrett was optioned and recalled multiple times during the season. In 14 starts for Louisville he was 2–4 with a 5.72 ERA, and in 16 games (14 starts) for Cincinnati, he compiled a 3–8 record and 7.39 ERA.

Garrett began the 2018 season in the Cincinnati bullpen. In 66 games, he was 1–2 with a 4.29 ERA and 71 strikeouts in 63 innings.

In an April 7, 2019, game against the Pittsburgh Pirates, Garrett was ejected after his role in a bench clearing incident involving Chris Archer, Derek Dietrich, Yasiel Puig, David Bell, Keone Kela, and Felipe Vázquez. Garrett was involved in another bench clearing incident against the Pirates on July 30, charging the Pirates dugout and throwing punches at players in the dugout. Garrett was ejected along with Puig, Archer, Francisco Cervelli, Kyle Crick, and Trevor Williams. On August 1, 2019, Garrett was suspended for 8 games.

In 2020 for Cincinnati, Garrett appeared in 21 games, recording a 2.45 ERA with 26 strikeouts in  innings pitched. Garrett had a 6.04 ERA in 63 appearances in 2021.

Kansas City Royals
On March 16, 2022, the Reds traded Garrett to the Kansas City Royals in exchange for Mike Minor. The Royals placed Garrett on the injured list on May 31.

On January 13, 2023, Garrett agreed to a one-year, $2.65 million contract with the Royals, avoiding salary arbitration.

Personal
Garrett and his wife, Tausana, were engaged in 2018 and later married.

See also
List of multi-sport athletes

References

External links

Living people
1992 births
Sportspeople from the Las Vegas Valley
People from Victorville, California
Baseball players from Los Angeles
Basketball players from Los Angeles
African-American baseball players
Major League Baseball pitchers
Cincinnati Reds players
Kansas City Royals players
Findlay Prep alumni
St. John's Red Storm men's basketball players
Arizona League Reds players
Billings Mustangs players
Baseball players from Nevada
Dayton Dragons players
Daytona Tortugas players
Pensacola Blue Wahoos players
Louisville Bats players
American men's basketball players
Small forwards
Sportspeople from San Bernardino County, California
21st-century African-American sportspeople